Vivir Sin Ti (English: Living Without You") may refer to:

"Vivir Sin Ti", a 1986 song by Yuri on her album Un corazón herido
"Vivir Sin Ti", a 2010 song by Gilberto Santa Rosa on his album Irrepetible
"Vivir Sin Ti", an unreleased song by Jennifer Lopez
"Vivir Sin Ti, a 1999 song by Cristian Castro on his album Mi Vida Sin Tu Amor
"Vivir Sin Ti", a song by Camilo Sesto
"Vivir Sin Ti", a song by María Victoria
"Vivir Sin Ti", a song by La Factoría